Advanced FLOW engineering (aFe) is a manufacturer of automotive cold air intake systems, performance air filters, fluid filters, intake manifolds, turbochargers, programmers, throttle body spacers and exhaust systems. aFe was founded in 1999 and is headquartered in Corona, California, United States, in two facilities totaling  including their  headquarters and manufacturing facilities. An  warehouse and R&D facility was added in 2012.

History
The aFe product line includes over 2,300 applications, which are all designed, developed and manufactured in Corona, California. The aFe Power product line-up includes air filters, air intake and exhaust systems for most late model cars and trucks. In the fall of 2007, aFe added diesel fluid filters for diesel applications. In 2008, aFe introduced the Aries 1 and Aries 2 filters and intakes for popular powersport applications. 2009 saw the release of the Bladerunner intercooler Intercooler for diesel applications as well as the Takeda USA intake line for sport compacts.

In 2012 aFe Power entered into the differential cover and transmission pan market. 2011 saw the release of a new turbocharger and Scorcher Programmer product lines.

aFe produces three versions of air filter media including their original Pro 5R, Pro Guard 7 and Pro Dry S. The Pro 5R media is a five layer cotton gauze media to maximize filtration and airflow. The patented Pro-Guard 7 is their seven-layer filter media combining the Pro 5R media with the addition of two additional layers of synthetic media. Both of these media require filter recharging oil. The Pro Dry S media is a three layer synthetic media, requires no filter oil, and cleans with soap and water. All aFe Power filters are washable and reusable.

aFe specializes in the diesel truck performance aftermarket with a line-up of products for these applications. aFe's Pro Guard D2 filter program includes oil, fuel and transmission filters. The Blade Runner intake manifold inlet manifold released in 2007, pushes toward complete air flow management systems. aFe produces exhaust systems for diesel applications.

Milestones and awards
aFe Power was an associate sponsor of Allan Pflueger's and Chuck Foreman's off-road racing trucks. Chuck Foreman won the 2007 Baja 1000 with an aFe intake system using the Pro Guard 7 filter.

In 2009 and 2010 aFe was awarded the SEMA Global Media Award and in 2007 was awarded "Editors Choice Product of the Year" by an off-road business magazine.

References

 Full Size Chevy Magazine
 Eurotuner

External links

Automotive companies of the United States
Companies based in Corona, California